was a Japanese football player.

Playing career
Fujikawa was born in Kawasaki on October 10, 1962. He joined Japan Soccer League club Yomiuri (later Verdy Kawasaki) from youth team in 1981. He played many matches as goalkeeper in 1985–86 season. After that, he battles with Shinkichi Kikuchi for the position for a long time. In 1992, Japan Soccer League was folded and founded new league J1 League. However his opportunity to play decreased behind Kikuchi. He retired end of 1995 season.

Coaching career
After retirement, Fujikawa started coaching career at Verdy Kawasaki in 1996. He served goalkeeper coach until 2000. From 2001, he coached at many J.League clubs, Vissel Kobe (2001–2004), Vegalta Sendai (2005), Cerezo Osaka (2007) and Avispa Fukuoka (2008–2009). He also managed Konan University (2006) and International Budo University (2010). In May 2017, he became a chairman for Tokachi FC (later Hokkaido Tokachi Sky Earth).

On November 15, 2018, Fujikawa died of stomach cancer at the age of 56.

Club statistics

References

External links

1962 births
2018 deaths
Association football people from Kanagawa Prefecture
Japanese footballers
Japan Soccer League players
J1 League players
Tokyo Verdy players
Association football goalkeepers